Alfredo Valentini (born 5 July 1946) is a Sammarinese sports shooter. He competed in the mixed trap event at the 1988 Summer Olympics.

References

1946 births
Living people
Sammarinese male sport shooters
Olympic shooters of San Marino
Shooters at the 1988 Summer Olympics
Place of birth missing (living people)